Arndell may refer to:

People
 Arndell Lewis (1897–1943), Australian politician

Places
 Arndell Park, New South Wales, suburb of Sydney, Australia

Schools
 Arndell School, special school in Sydney, Australia
 Arndell Anglican College, day school in Sydney, Australia